Gus Williams (born October 10, 1953) is an American former professional basketball player in the National Basketball Association (NBA). Nicknamed "the Wizard", he played for the Seattle SuperSonics, winning an NBA championship in 1979. He also played for the Golden State Warriors, Washington Bullets and Atlanta Hawks.

High school and college
Williams played high school basketball at Mount Vernon, where he was selected player of the year in 1971 by the New York State Sportswriters Association.  He played college basketball at the University of Southern California.

Professional career
Williams was selected in the second round of the 1975 NBA draft by the Golden State Warriors and in the first round of the 1975 ABA draft by the Spirits of St. Louis.  Williams signed with the Warriors for the 1975–76 season and was named to the NBA All-Rookie Team in his first season.  Williams played two seasons with the Warriors before he was allowed to leave as a free agent before the 1977–78 season, when he signed with the Seattle SuperSonics.

While with Seattle, Williams was twice selected to the NBA All-Star Game, and was an All-NBA First Team (1982) and All-NBA Second Team (1980) selection.  Williams, whose style of play earned him the nickname "the Wizard", led the Sonics to the 1979 league title while averaging a team-high 28.6 points per game in the Finals.

While in the prime of his career, Williams sat out the entire 1980–81 season due to a contract dispute.  He returned in 1981–82 and was named the NBA Comeback Player of the Year after finishing seventh in the league in scoring (23.4). He played three more seasons with the Sonics after that.  In 1984, he signed with the Washington Bullets.  During the 1984–85 season Williams played alongside the similarly named Guy Williams.

He finished his career with a 17.1 point-per-game scoring average in a career spanning 12 years from 1975 to 1987.  In 2004 Williams' #1 jersey was retired by the Sonics. In 2016 Williams' jersey was retired by USC.

Williams' younger brother Ray (1954–2013) also played in the NBA.

Popular culture references
Williams is one of five 1970s Seattle SuperSonics players whose names are featured on characters in "The Exterminator," the third episode of Season 1 of iZombie. The other four are Freddie Brown, Wally Walker, Marvin Webster and Don Watts.

NBA career statistics

Regular season 

|-
| style="text-align:left;"| 
| style="text-align:left;"|Golden State
| 77 || – || 22.4 || .428 || – || .742 || 2.1 || 3.1 || 1.8 || 0.3 || 11.7
|-
| style="text-align:left;"| 
| style="text-align:left;"|Golden State
| 82 || – || 23.5 || .464 || – || .747 || 2.8 || 3.6 || 1.5 || 0.2 || 9.3
|-
| style="text-align:left;"| 
| style="text-align:left;"|Seattle
| 79 || – || 32.6 || .451 || – || .817 || 3.2 || 3.7 || 2.3 || 0.5 || 18.1
|-
| style="text-align:left;background:#afe6ba;"|†
| style="text-align:left;"|Seattle
| 76 || – || 29.8 || .495 || – || .775 || 3.2 || 4.0 || 2.1 || 0.4 || 19.2
|-
| style="text-align:left;"| 
| style="text-align:left;"|Seattle
| 82 || – || 36.2 || .482 || .194 || .788 || 3.4 || 4.8 || 2.4 || 0.5 || 22.1
|-
| style="text-align:left;"| 
| style="text-align:left;"|Seattle
| 80 || 80 || 36.0 || .486 || .225 || .734 || 3.1 || 6.9 || 2.2 || 0.5 || 23.4
|-
| style="text-align:left;"| 
| style="text-align:left;"|Seattle
| 80 || 80 || 34.5 || .477 || .047 || .751 || 2.6 || 8.0 || 2.3 || 0.3 || 20.0
|-
| style="text-align:left;"| 
| style="text-align:left;"|Seattle
| 80 || 80 || 35.2|| .458 || .160 || .750 || 2.6 || 8.4 || 2.4 || 0.3 || 18.7
|-
| style="text-align:left;"| 
| style="text-align:left;"|Washington
| 79 || 78 || 37.5 || .430 || .290 || .725 || 2.5 || 7.7 || 2.3 || 0.4 || 20.0
|-
| style="text-align:left;"| 
| style="text-align:left;"|Washington
| 77 || 67 || 29.7 || .428 || .259 || .734 || 2.2 || 5.9 || 1.2 || 0.2 || 13.5
|-
| style="text-align:left;"| 
| style="text-align:left;"|Atlanta
| 33 || 0 || 14.6 || .363 || .278 || .675 || 1.2 || 4.2 || 0.5 || 0.2 || 4.5
|- class="sortbottom"
| style="text-align:center;" colspan="2"| Career
| 825 || 385 || 31.1 || .461 || .238 || .756 || 2.7 || 5.6 || 2.0 || 0.4 || 17.1
|- class="sortbottom"
| style="text-align:center;" colspan="2"| All-Star
| 2 || 1 || 20.5 || .429 || .000 || 1.000 || 1.5 || 6.5 || 1.0 || 0.0 || 14.0

Playoffs 

|-
|style="text-align:left;"|1976
|style="text-align:left;”|Golden State
|11||–||16.2||.353||–||.667||1.3||2.4||1.0||0.0||6.7
|-
|style="text-align:left;"|1977
|style="text-align:left;”|Golden State
|10||–||18.4||.500||–||.857||1.5||2.5||0.8||0.1||8.8
|-
|style="text-align:left;"|1978
|style="text-align:left;”|Seattle
|22||–||31.9||.477||–||.726||3.9||4.0||2.0||0.5||18.3
|-
| style="text-align:left;background:#afe6ba;"|1979†
|style="text-align:left;”|Seattle
|17||–||36.4||.476||–||.709||4.1||3.7||2.0||0.6||26.7
|-
| style="text-align:left;background;"|1980
|style="text-align:left;”|Seattle
|15||–||37.6||.514||.200||.721||4.0||5.6||2.3||0.5||23.7
|-
| style="text-align:left;background;"|1982
|style="text-align:left;”|Seattle
|8||–||39.4||.441||.333||.786||3.3||8.1||1.6||0.6||26.3
|-
| style="text-align:left;background;"|1983
|style="text-align:left;”|Seattle
|2||–||40.5||.553||.000||.867||3.5||4.0||2.5||0.0||32.5
|-
| style="text-align:left;background;"|1984
|style="text-align:left;”|Seattle
|5||–||43.0||.510||.333||.714||2.4||11.4||1.6||0.6||23.4
|-
| style="text-align:left;background;"|1985
|style="text-align:left;”|Washington
|4||4||39.8||.423||.300||.750||2.0||5.0||1.3||0.3||18.0
|-
| style="text-align:left;background;"|1986
|style="text-align:left;”|Washington
|5||5||39.8||.481||.100||.778||2.0||6.6||2.2||0.0||18.2
|- class="sortbottom"
| style="text-align:center;" colspan="2"| Career
| 99 || 9 || 32.5 || .476 || .231 || .737 || 3.1 || 4.7 || 1.8 || 0.4 || 19.5

See also
List of National Basketball Association career steals leaders
List of National Basketball Association career playoff steals leaders
List of National Basketball Association players with most steals in a game
List of National Basketball Association players with most assists in a game

Notes

External links
 Sonics.com tribute
 NBA.com History player file: Gus Williams
 Gus Williams – official website

1953 births
Living people
African-American basketball players
All-American college men's basketball players
American men's basketball players
Atlanta Hawks players
Basketball players from New York (state)
Golden State Warriors draft picks
Golden State Warriors players
National Basketball Association All-Stars
National Basketball Association players with retired numbers
Parade High School All-Americans (boys' basketball)
Point guards
Seattle SuperSonics players
Spirits of St. Louis draft picks
Sportspeople from Mount Vernon, New York
USC Trojans men's basketball players
Washington Bullets players
21st-century African-American people
20th-century African-American sportspeople
Mount Vernon High School (New York) alumni